South Korea competed at the 2009 Asian Martial Arts Games held in Bangkok, Thailand from August 1, 2009 to August 9, 2009. South Korea finished with 10 gold medals, 6 silver medals, and 3 bronze medals.

Medal summary

Medal table

Medalists

2009 in South Korean sport
2009 Asian Martial Arts Games
South Korea at the Asian Indoor and Martial Arts Games